Scudder Falls is an area of whitewater rapids along the Delaware River between Ewing, New Jersey and Lower Makefield, Pennsylvania in the United States. It is popular with local whitewater enthusiasts.

Scudder Falls derives its name from Richard Betts Scudder, who according to the Long Island Genealogy Surname Database, died in 1754 at "Scudder Falls, Hunterdon County" (Mercer County was part of Hunterdon County until 1838). One of Richard Scudder's ancestors from Kent, England was named Henry Skudder. The k in the surname apparently became a c at some point in time, helping to give the falls its name. The falls lends its name to the Scudder Falls Bridge, located just downstream, and the Scudder Falls section of Ewing, New Jersey.

References

Delaware River
Ewing Township, New Jersey
Landforms of Bucks County, Pennsylvania
Waterfalls of Pennsylvania
Tourist attractions in Bucks County, Pennsylvania
Rapids of the United States